Miss Malta Universe is a beauty pageant competition. The contest selects the country representative for Miss Universe. The Maltese titleholder for 2022 is Maxine Formosa of St. Julian's.

History
The Maltanese beauty pageant held for the first time in 1963 called Miss Malta beauty pageant or Star of Malta. In the beginning the Miss Universe representatives from Malta selected by Miss Malta pageant until 2001. George & Deggie Gatt Mangion as the founder of Miss Malta took over the franchise so many years until 2016 Alan J. Darmanin looked forward to take the license of Miss Universe back in Malta. Began in 2016 the new creation of Miss Universe Malta Organization created. The winner is expected to be representative of Malta at Miss Universe pageant.

National franchise holders
George & Deggie Gatt Mangion (1963―2001)
Alan J. Darmanin (2016―present)

Titleholders

International pageants

Miss Universe Malta

Below is Miss Malta Universe since 2016. The winner goes to Miss Universe. On occasion, when the winner does not qualify (due to age) for either contest, a runner-up is sent.

Star of Malta / Miss Malta 1968-2001
 

Below is Miss Malta who was sent the winners to Miss Universe between 1968 and 2001.

References 

Miss Universe by country
Beauty pageants in Malta
Recurring events established in 2016
2016 establishments in Malta